Pierre Charles Weiss (15 January 1779, Besançon (Doubs department) – 11 February 1866, Besançon) was a 19th-century French librarian and bibliographer.

Member of learned societies 
 Société des Antiquaires de France (1807)
 Corresponding member of the Académie des inscriptions et belles-lettres (1832)
 Académie des sciences, belles-lettres et arts de Besançon et de Franche-Comté
 Comité des travaux historiques et scientifiques (1842-1855)

Publications 

Catalogue de la bibliothèque de M. Paris, architecte et dessinateur de la Chambre du roi... suivi de la description de son cabinet, Besançon, Deiss, 1821, VIII-256
Biographie universelle, ou Dictionnaire historique contenant la nécrologie des hommes célèbres de tous les pays, Paris, Furne, 1841.
Papiers d’État du cardinal de Granvelle d’après les manuscrits de la Bibliothèque de Besançon, Paris, bibliothèque royale puis bibliothèque nationale, 1841-1852, 9 vol.Lettres de Charles Weiss à Charles Nodier, éd. L. Pingaud, Paris, Honoré Champion, 1889.Journal d’un Bisontin pendant l’année 1815, éd. L. Pingaud, Besançon, Vve P. Jacquin, 1903.Journal (1815-1822), éd. S. Lepin, Paris, Les Belles-Lettres, 1972.Journal (1823-1833), éd. S. Lepin, Paris, Les Belles-Lettres, 1981.Journal (1834-1837), éd. S. Lepin, Paris, Les Belles-Lettres, 1990.Journal (1838-1842)'', éd. S. Lepin, Paris, Les Belles-lettres, 1997.

French librarians
French bibliographers
19th-century French historians
Members of the Académie des Inscriptions et Belles-Lettres
Officiers of the Légion d'honneur
1779 births
1866 deaths
Writers from Besançon

References